John Harte (10 December 1920 – 9 March 2015) was an Irish Labour Party Senator.

A former trade union official, Harte was first elected to the 13th Seanad in the 1973 Seanad elections, on the Labour Panel. He was re-elected six times until his retirement at the 1992 elections.

He served with the British Army in second battalion of the Royal Irish Fusiliers the in Malta and the Middle East during World War II. He published his memoirs of the Second World War, To the Limits of Endurance: One Irishman's War. In 2015, he died at the age of 94.

References

1920 births
2015 deaths
Labour Party (Ireland) senators
Members of the 13th Seanad
Members of the 14th Seanad
Members of the 15th Seanad
Members of the 16th Seanad
Members of the 17th Seanad
Members of the 18th Seanad
Members of the 19th Seanad
Irish trade unionists
British Army personnel of World War II